Agnes Flight (Japanese : アグネスフライト, March 2, 1997 - January 11, 2023) was a Japanese Thoroughbred racehorse. He was sired by Sunday Silence covering Agnes Flora, and is therefore full-brother to Agnes Tachyon.

Racing career

As a three-year-old, Agnes Flight, ridden by Hiroshi Kawachi, won the Tokyo Yushun (Japanese Derby). That year, he also won the Kyoto Shimbun Hai and the Wakakusa Stakes. He came second in the Kobe Shimbun Hai.

During his four-year-old season, Agnes Flight came second in the Kyōto Kinen. Overall, he started 14 times during his career, won four times, and came second twice.

Later life

In 2004, Agnes Flight was sent to stand at stud at Hidaka Stallion Station. He stood there until 2011. He later became a training horse for new recruits at the Shadai Farm before being pensioned at the Shadai Blue Grass Farm in 2015.

Agnes Flight was euthanized on January 11, 2023 after he could no longer stand despite efforts due to his age.

Pedigree

References

1997 racehorse births
2023 racehorse deaths
Racehorses bred in Japan
Racehorses trained in Japan
Thoroughbred family 1-l